Brettenham is a village and civil parish in the English county of Norfolk.
For the purposes of local government, it falls within the district of Breckland.

History
Brettenham's name is of Anglo-Saxon origin and derives from the Old English for Bretta's village or farmstead.

In the Domesday Book, Brettenham is recorded as consisting of 40 households which are divided in ownership between Roger Bigod, St. Etheldreda's Abbey in Ely, Eudo Dapifer and John, Nephew of Walderan.

Parish church
St. Andrew's Church is Norman in origin and suffered extensive damage in a fire in 1693 that also destroyed the parsonage. The church was significantly remodelled in the 1850s by Samuel Sanders Teulon at great expense and subsequently by A. L. Moore.

In the tower hangs five bells the earliest complete ring by John Taylor & Co in the country. They were cast in 1852 as a gift by Isabella Buxton who 'contributed a peal of five finely toned bells, cast by Messrs Taylors of Loughborough,' according to the Norfolk Chronicle as part of renovations to the tower. The bell frame and fittings have been damaged due to a leak in the tower roof so ringing ceased in 1930. Minor repairs were made in 1991, however one of the foundation beams was determined to be weaker than originally thought, thus ringing was stopped.

References

External links

Villages in Norfolk
Civil parishes in Norfolk
Breckland District